Metropolis was a town in the interior of ancient Acarnania, south of Stratus, and on the road from the latter place to Conope in Aetolia. At a later time it fell into the hands of the Aetolians, but was taken and burned by Philip V of Macedon in his expedition against the Aetolians, 219 BCE. It is mentioned as one of the towns of Acarnania, in a Greek inscription found at Actium, the date of which is probably prior to the time of Augustus. 

Its site is located near the modern Rigani.

References

Populated places in ancient Acarnania
Cities in ancient Greece
Former populated places in Greece